Leo Joseph Goodwin (November 13, 1883 – May 25, 1957) was an American swimmer, diver, and water polo player. He competed in the 1904 and 1908 Summer Olympics and won medals in all three disciplines.

Goodwin nearly lost his arm after blood poisoning in 1906. Dr. Dave Hennen, a swimmer from his club and a famous surgeon, dissected his entire forearm while cleaning it from poison, then re-assembled the veins, muscles and ligaments. Goodwin quickly recovered, but was unfit for the 1906 Olympics.

At the 1915 Panama–Pacific International Exposition Goodwin set an outdoor record by swimming 3.5 miles in 1 hour and 38 minutes in San Francisco Bay.  He won by 200 yards. He later received the Congressional Gold Medal, the highest peacetime award in the United States, for rescuing people from drowning at Newport News, Virginia. He retired from active competitions in 1922, but continued swimming through his seventies. In 1971 he was inducted into the International Swimming Hall of Fame as an "Honor Swimmer".

See also
 List of members of the International Swimming Hall of Fame
 List of athletes with Olympic medals in different disciplines
 List of Olympic medalists in swimming (men)

References

1883 births
1957 deaths
American male freestyle swimmers
American male water polo players
Divers at the 1904 Summer Olympics
American male divers
Olympic bronze medalists for the United States in swimming
Olympic gold medalists for the United States in swimming
Olympic divers of the United States
Olympic medalists in diving
Olympic medalists in water polo
Olympic water polo players of the United States
Sportspeople from New York City
Swimmers at the 1904 Summer Olympics
Swimmers at the 1908 Summer Olympics
Water polo players at the 1904 Summer Olympics
Medalists at the 1908 Summer Olympics
Medalists at the 1904 Summer Olympics
20th-century American people